Dva ohně is a 1949 Czechoslovak film. The film starred Josef Kemr.

References

External links
 

1949 films
1940s Czech-language films
Czech drama films
Czechoslovak black-and-white films
1940s Czech films